Alfonso Lanard Marshall (born January 17, 1981) is a former American football cornerback who played for the Chicago Bears.  He was selected with the 14th pick of the seventh round in the 2004 NFL Draft, out of the University of Miami. He was waived on September 5.

References

1981 births
Living people
American football cornerbacks
People from Clewiston, Florida
Players of American football from Florida
Chicago Bears players
Miami Hurricanes football players